Canción para Pablo Neruda is an album by Argentine singer and guitarist Atahualpa Yupanqui. It was released in 1975 on the Le Chant du Monde label.

Track listing
Side A
 "Cancion para Pablo Neruda" (Atahualpa Yupanqui) [4:00]
 "Milonga Triste" (Sebastian Piana, Homeno Manzi) [3:00]
 "Baguala del Gaucho Pobre" (A. Yupanqui) [3:45]
 "Juan Careno" (A. Yupanqui) [2:10]
 "Milonga del Solitario" (A. Yupanqui) [3:40]

Side B
 "Nada Mas" (A. Yupanqui, Pablo del Cerro) [3:15]
 "Dos Milongas Urguayas: 1. Silbando piensan las aves, 2. Humito de mi cigarro" (A. Yupanqui, R. Risso) [4:08]
 "La Paulita" (Pablo del Cerro) [2:10]
 "Cancion Del Arriero de Llamas" (A. Yupanqui) [3:05]
 "Recuerdos de el Portezuelo" (A. Yupanqui) [4:00]

References

1975 albums
Atahualpa Yupanqui albums